The Spitfire is a high-performance catamaran used for training and racing. It was designed by two Olympic gold medalists in the Tornado class, Reg White and Yves Loday.

In the UK, the Spitfire is the RYA Youth Catamaran as well as a successful racing class with National Championships held annually. The youth squad sailors compete at the class events like open meetings and nationals as well as some 'youth only' events such as the RYA Youth National Championships and youth squad training events.

Overview
The Spitfire, at 16 ft, is relatively small in comparison to the other main catamaran racing classes in the UK (F18s, Tornados, Hurricane 5.9s, Dart 18s and Sprint 15s). The Spitfire is a competitive racing class at handicap events, Spitfire events or in club races and is regularly seen in pole position at UK catamaran events. The British Spitfire Class Association provide the latest Spitfire news via their Facebook page
and organize Spitfire events such as the inland and nationals championships. The Inland Championships are raced for the Jess Eales Memorial Trophy, in memory of one of the classes best and most well respected sailors.

Youth Squad
The Spitfire was selected to replace the Hobie Dragoon as the RYA Youth Catamaran and since then it has become a top youth class. After the 34th Americas Cup which was held on AC45 and AC72 Catamarans, the numbers of sailors not only in the youth squad, but in the class in general, reached record numbers and at the 2016 RYA Youth Nationals, 13 entries were recorded (almost twice the number of entries in 2014). The UKCRA Youth Squad use the Spitfire as their training platform and their main racing class however the squad also attend events in other classes such as the SL16 World Championships and the Red Bull Foiling Generation. The Spitfire was replaced as the RYA Youth Multihull in 2017 by the new Nacra 15.

Champions 
European Champion

UK National Champion

UK Inland Champion

UK Youth National Champion

Notable Sailors
Chris Rashley: International Moth UK National Champion 2015

Rupert White: SL16 ISAF Youth World Championships Bronze Medal (Helm) 2011 and SL16 ISAF Youth World Championships Gold Medal (Helm) 2012

Nicola Boniface: SL16 ISAF Youth World Champion (Crew) 2011

Tom Britz: SL16 ISAF Youth World Championships Gold Medal (Crew) 2012

James Henson: SL16 ISAF Youth World Championships Bronze Medal (Helm) 2013

Oli Greber: SL16 ISAF Youth World Championships Bronze Medal (Crew) 2013

References

http://www.yachtsandyachting.com/class/Spitfire
http://www.spitfiresailing.org.uk/
https://www.facebook.com/pages/Spitfire-Sailing-UK/127859340600800
http://www.youthcat.org.uk/
https://www.facebook.com/UKCRAyouth

Catamarans